The 2019–20 SAFA Second Division (known as the ABC Motsepe League for sponsorship reasons) was the 22nd season of the SAFA Second Division, the third tier for South African association football clubs, since its establishment in 1998. Due to the size of South Africa, the competition was split into nine divisions, one for each region. After the league stage of the regional competition is completed, the nine winning teams of each regional division entered the playoffs.

Regions

Eastern Cape

Free State

Gauteng

Kwazulu-Natal

Limpopo

Mpumalanga

North West

Northern Cape

Western Cape

Playoff stage

Group A

Group B

Group C

Semi-finals

Playoff final

References

SAFA Second Division seasons
2019–20 in South African soccer leagues